Ahmet Sivri (born 6 July 1999) is a Northern Cypriot footballer who plays as a striker for Ankara Demirspor.

Career

In 2017, Sivri signed for Turkish top flight side Galatasaray. In 2020, he signed for Ankara Demirspor in the Turkish third tier.

References

External links

 

1999 births
Ankara Demirspor footballers
Association football forwards
Expatriate footballers in Turkey
Galatasaray S.K. footballers
Living people
TFF Second League players
Turkish Cypriot footballers